The Armenia national futsal team is managed by the Football Federation of Armenia, the governing body for futsal in Armenia and represents the country in international futsal competitions, such as the World Cup and the European Championships.

Competition history

FIFA Futsal World Cup

UEFA Futsal Championship

Players

Current squad
The following players were called up to the squad for the UEFA 2024 FIFA Futsal World Cup qualification match against Bosnia and Herzegovina on 8 March 2023.
Head coach: Ruben Nazaretyan

Recent call-ups
The following players have also been called up to the squad within the last 12 months.

COV Player withdrew from the squad due to contracting COVID-19.
INJ Player withdrew from the squad due to an injury.
PRE Preliminary squad.
RET Retired from international futsal.

See also
 Armenian Futsal Premier League
 Sport in Armenia

References

External links
Football Federation of Armenia

Armenia
Futsal
Futsal in Armenia